Murrayfield Stadium (known as BT Murrayfield Stadium for sponsorship reasons, or popularly as Murrayfield) is a rugby stadium located in the Murrayfield area of Edinburgh, Scotland. It has a seating capacity of 67,144 making it the largest stadium in Scotland and the fifth largest in the United Kingdom.

The stadium is the home of the Scottish Rugby Union (SRU) and is mainly used as a venue for rugby union. The stadium hosts most of Scotland's home test matches and the Scottish Hydro Electric Cup final, as well as URC and European Rugby Champions Cup matches.

Although primarily a rugby union stadium, Murrayfield has in the past hosted American football, rugby league and association football matches, as well as numerous music concerts.

History

Purchase of land
The SRU identified 19 acres of land at Murrayfield, purchasing this from Edinburgh Polo Club at Murrayfield, having raised money through debentures. A stand and three embankments were constructed, which took two years. Previous internationals had been played at Inverleith but it was not large enough to cope with the increasing number of spectators. Arthur Sellers was the stadium's first groundsman, having previously prepared the pitches at Inverleith. On 21 March 1925  were the first team to visit Murrayfield, with 70,000 people watching  beat them to win their first Five Nations Championship Grand Slam.

Usage during WWII
During the Second World War the ground at Murrayfield was offered to the nation and was taken over by the Royal Army Service Corps and used as a supply depot. During the war years the armed forces sports authorities managed to arrange two Scotland v. England services internationals each year, on a home-and-away basis. Scotland's home matches were played at Inverleith for the first two years with a return to Murrayfield in 1944 after that ground's derequisition.

Recent history

Murrayfield's record attendance of 104,000 was set on 1 March 1975 when Scotland defeated  12–10 during the 1975 Five Nations Championship. This attendance stood as a world record until 1999, and remains a European record. The East stand was built in 1983.

In October 1991 another debenture scheme was launched, to finance a more comprehensive redevelopment of the West Stand. The new West Stand was designed with a 48-metre cantilever roof. The old West Stand housed a museum, but this was not replaced and plans for a new visitor centre were shelved when the game turned professional. The first phase was completed in January 1993 with the new north and south stands opening. In February 1994 the centre section of the new West Stand opened. The work was carried out by Tilbury Douglas.

In 1994, Murrayfield completed a £50-million renovation where floodlights were installed for the first time. 

In October 2012, SRU chief executive Mark Dodson told the BBC that it was actively seeking a name sponsor for Murrayfield:The single biggest piece of our inventory is our national stadium. We would like to see if we can monetise that. It would be crazy for us not to look at using our single biggest piece of inventory to drive revenue. We want to get the right price for it. In addition, Dodson indicated that the SRU was actively seeking a site for a completely new stadium with a capacity of 10,000 to 15,000 as a future home for Edinburgh Rugby. The pitch was damaged by nematodes in the lead up to the 2013 autumn internationals. This led the SRU to replace the grass with a Desso surface from the start of the 2014 season. A naming rights deal with BT was agreed in May 2014, resulting in the stadium being officially named as the BT Murrayfield Stadium.

Location
Murrayfield is located next to Murrayfield Ice Rink, Murrayfield Curling Rink, and is close to Edinburgh Zoo. It is named after the area of Edinburgh it is located in, Murrayfield. There are two cricket pitches in the immediate vicinity at Roseburn Park used by Murrayfield DAFS CC (formed from mergers between several local teams) and also four rugby pitches owned by the SRU which were used by teams including the amateur club Murrayfield Wanderers RFC - they and their predecessors had played there since 1902 but were asked to vacate in 2018 as the governing body had plans to develop the land. Wanderers moved their training base to Roseburn but continued to hire the Murrayfield pitches for some matches.

Transport

Buses
The stadium is served by Lothian Bus services 12, 22, 26, 31 and the Airlink(100) along Corstorphine Road. Post-match traffic congestion is common along this route.

Rail

Interchange with the Edinburgh Trams is available at Haymarket,  and  stations.  is a short walk from the St Andrew Square tram stop.

Tram
Murrayfield Stadium tram stop is located adjacent to the stadium entrance turnstiles on Roseburn Street. Access to the platform is by a flight of stairs or lift. As part of crowd-management measures, ticketing machines are situated at the bottom of the staircase and not the platform.

Uses

Rugby union

Murrayfield is used for most Scottish international rugby union matches, with all Scotland's Six Nations home games being played in the stadium. The stadium also hosted all of Edinburgh's matches between 1996 and January 2017. (For Pro14 matches, only the lower tier of the East Stand is typically used.) 
Since February 2018 all Edinburgh matches are once again held at Murrayfield; with work now finished on the construction of a new 7,800 capacity stadium on the back pitches to host Edinburgh Rugby from the start of the 2021/22 season.

From 2007 to 2011, Murrayfield hosted the Edinburgh 7s, then the final event in the annual IRB Sevens World Series in rugby sevens, but that tournament was moved to Glasgow starting in 2012 due to low attendance. Murrayfield hosted select matches from the 2007 Rugby World Cup. The stadium also hosted the Heineken Cup Final in 2005, when Toulouse beat Stade Français 18–12, and again in 2009, with Leinster defeating Leicester 19–16.

Rugby World Cup
Murrayfield hosted matches of the 1991, 1999 and 2007 Rugby World Cups.

1991

1999

2007

Rugby league
Although primarily a rugby union stadium, Murrayfield hosted the Rugby League Challenge Cup Finals of 2000 and 2002. The stadium hosted rugby league's Super League Magic Weekend in 2009. The record for a rugby league attendance at the stadium is 67,247 for the 2000 Challenge Cup Final.

Association football
Murrayfield has also hosted association football matches. In December 2003, the SRU board agreed to let local Scottish Premier League side Heart of Midlothian F.C. (Hearts) lease the stadium for match days. Later that month, UEFA confirmed that Hearts' own ground, Tynecastle did not meet the minimum criteria for European matches from the 2004–05 season. Hearts used Murrayfield as their home venue for European matches for three years until Hearts made adjustments to Tynecastle that made it compliant with UEFA regulations. Additionally, both Hearts and Edinburgh neighbours Hibernian have played preseason friendlies against FC Barcelona at Murrayfield. Almost 58,000 people attended to watch Hearts play Barcelona in July 2007, recording the largest crowd at a football match in Edinburgh for 51 years.

In 2014, Glasgow club Celtic played two qualifying matches at the stadium due to Celtic Park being unavailable because of Glasgow's hosting of the 2014 Commonwealth Games. Hearts again used the stadium for home games during the 2017–18 Scottish Premiership, due to the delays in construction of a new main stand at Tynecastle. Murrayfield hosted one of the 2018–19 Scottish League Cup semi-finals, played between Hearts and Celtic, in October 2018. That match attracted an attendance of 61,161, the second-largest ever recorded for a football match in Edinburgh. In July 2019, Murrayfield hosted a pre-season friendly between Liverpool and Napoli, that attracted a crowd of 65,442 which was the highest attendance of fans at a football match in Scotland since the 1989 Scottish Cup Final.

American football
Murrayfield has played host to American football and was one of two home venues for the now defunct Scottish Claymores in the NFL Europa between 1995 and 2004, the other being Hampden Park in Glasgow. Additionally, it hosted World Bowl '96 on 23 June 1996. It has been mentioned as a potential future host site for the NFL International Series, should the National Football League add future games outside the series' current permanent home, Tottenham Hotspur Stadium in London. (From 2007 to 2018 the permanent home of the NFL International Series was Wembley Stadium also in London.)

Music
David Bowie played to a capacity crowd of 47,000 people on 28 June 1983. Simple Minds were scheduled to play at the stadium in 1989, but pulled out because of Jim Kerr's objections to the venue's administrators allowing Scottish rugby players to attend the sport's centenary celebrations in South Africa, which was then still under apartheid. On 30 June 1996, Tina Turner played at Murrayfield as part of her Wildest Dreams Tour. In September 1997 U2 played at Murrayfield as part of their Popmart Tour. On 3 June 1999, The Rolling Stones played to 51,000 on their No Security Tour. On 8 July 1999 Celine Dion performed her Let's Talk About Love World Tour as she sold out the full venue of 67,000, on her first ever show in Scotland. In July 2005, Murrayfield hosted the final Live 8 concert, Edinburgh 50,000 – The Final Push, with performances including James Brown, Texas and The Proclaimers. Oasis played a sold-out show on 17 June 2009, as part of their world tour. Some antisocial behaviour at this event affected the stadium's licensing arrangements when they were reviewed a few months later. This was the last time Oasis would play a concert in Scotland and the second time they had played the stadium, the first being on their Standing on the Shoulder of Giants Tour in 2000.

Bon Jovi performed at the stadium on 22 June 2011 as part of their tour. Madonna performed to a sell-out crowd of 52,160 on 21 July 2012 as part of her MDNA Tour. On 3 June 2014, One Direction performed to over 64,000 fans at Murrayfield as part of their Where We Are Stadium Tour. Foo Fighters performed at Murrayfield Stadium as part of their Sonic Highways World Tour on 8 September 2015. The band were originally supposed to play Murrayfield on 23 June 2015 but this was cancelled and rescheduled after Dave Grohl broke his foot at European Festival that same month. The Spice Girls performed to over 55,000 fans on 8 June 2019 as part of their Spice World tour, it was their first Scottish concert in 21 years.

See also

Rugby union in Scotland
Sport in Scotland
Scottish Women's Rugby Union

References

External links
Getting to BT Murrayfield on scottishrugby.org website

 

American football venues in Scotland
Football venues in Edinburgh
Music venues in Edinburgh
Scotland
Rugby league stadiums in Scotland
Rugby union in Edinburgh
Rugby union stadiums in Scotland
Rugby World Cup stadiums
Sports venues in Edinburgh
Scotland national rugby union team
Sports venues completed in 1925
Edinburgh Rugby
Scottish Professional Football League venues
Edinburgh Trams stops
1925 establishments in Scotland
World Rugby Sevens Series venues